Te Manga, on Rarotonga, is the highest point of the Cook Islands, a self-governing parliamentary democracy in free association with New Zealand, with an elevation of 652 meters (2,139 ft) above sea level.

See also
 Geography of the Cook Islands

External links
  Te Manga, Rarotonga, Tramping New Zealand.

Rarotonga
Te Manga
Mountains of Oceania